The Invisible Foe is an American short film. It starred Carlyle Blackwell, Louise Glaum and Raymond Hadley.

Kalem Company was the producing company.

The length is ten minutes.

References

External links

1913 films
1913 drama films
American silent short films
1913 short films
Silent American drama films
American black-and-white films
1910s American films